Florida National Forest was established by the U.S. Forest Service in Florida on July 1, 1911, with  by combining Ocala National Forest and Choctawhatchee National Forest. On October 17, 1927, the Ocala Division was separated to re-form Ocala National Forest. On November 10, 1927, the forest was renamed Choctawhatchee National Forest.

References

External links
Forest History Society
"Forest History Society: Listing of the National Forests of the United States" Text from Davis, Richard C., ed. Encyclopedia of American Forest and Conservation History. New York: Macmillan Publishing Company for the Forest History Society, 1983. Vol. II, pp. 743–788.

Former National Forests of the United States